Anthropic Bias: Observation Selection Effects in Science and Philosophy (2002) is a book by philosopher Nick Bostrom. Bostrom investigates how to reason when one suspects that evidence is biased by "observation selection effects", in other words, when the evidence presented has been pre-filtered by the condition that there was some appropriately positioned observer to "receive" the evidence. This conundrum is sometimes called the "anthropic principle," "self-locating belief," or "indexical information". Discussed concepts include the self-sampling assumption and the self-indication assumption.

As of February 2020, digital copies of the text can be obtained for free on Bostrom's personal webpage.

Self-sampling assumption
The self-sampling assumption (SSA), one of the two major schools of anthropic probability — the other being the self-indication assumption (SIA) — states that:

 All other things equal, an observer should reason as if they are randomly selected from the set of all actually existent observers (past, present and future) in their reference class.

For instance, if there is a coin flip that on heads will create one observer, while on tails it will create two, then we have two possible worlds, the first with one observer, the second with two. These worlds are equally probable, hence the SSA probability of being the first (and only) observer in the heads world is 1/2, that of being the first observer in the tails world is 1/2 × 1/2 = 1/4, and the probability of being the second observer in the tails world is also 1/4.

This is why SSA gives an answer of 1/2 probability of heads in the Sleeping Beauty problem.

Unlike SIA, SSA is dependent on the choice of reference class. If the agents in the above example were in the same reference class as a trillion other observers, then the probability of being in the heads world, upon the agent being told they are in the sleeping beauty problem, is ≈ 1/3, similar to SIA.

SSA may imply the doomsday argument depending on the choice of reference class. It is often used in anthropic reasoning.

Bostrom, in his book Anthropic Bias: Observation Selection Effects in Science and Philosophy, has suggested refining SSA to what he calls the strong self-sampling assumption (SSSA), which replaces "observers" in the SSA definition by "observer-moments". This coincides with the intuition that an observer who lives longer has more opportunities to experience herself existing, and it provides flexibility to refine reference classes in certain thought experiments in order to avoid paradoxical conclusions.

Self-indication assumption
The self-indication assumption (SIA) is a philosophical principle defined by Nick Bostrom in his book Anthropic Bias: Observation Selection Effects in Science and Philosophy. It states that:

All other things equal, an observer should reason as if they are randomly selected from the set of all possible observers.

Note that "randomly selected" is weighted by the probability of the observers existing: under SIA you are still unlikely to be an unlikely observer, unless there are a lot of them. It is one of the two major schools of anthropic probability, the other being the Self-Sampling Assumption (SSA).

For instance, if there is a coin flip that on heads will create one observer, while on tails it will create two, then we have three possible observers (1st observer on heads, 1st on tails, 2nd on tails). Each of these observers have an equal probability for existence, so SIA assigns 1/3 probability to each. Alternatively, this could be interpreted as saying there are two possible observers (1st observer on either heads or tails, 2nd observer on tails), the first existing with probability one and the second existing with probability 1/2, so SIA assigns 2/3 to being the first observer and 1/3 to being the second - which is the same as the first interpretation.

This is why SIA gives an answer of 1/3 probability of heads in the Sleeping Beauty Problem.

Notice that unlike SSA, SIA is not dependent on the choice of reference class, as long as the reference class is large enough to contain all subjectively indistinguishable observers. If the reference class is large, SIA will make it more likely, but this is compensated by the much reduced probability that the agent will be that particular agent in the larger reference class.

Although this anthropic principle was originally designed as a rebuttal to the Doomsday argument (by Dennis Dieks in 1992) it has general applications in the philosophy of anthropic reasoning, and Ken Olum has suggested it is important to the analysis of quantum cosmology.

Ken Olum has written in defense of the SIA. Nick Bostrom and Milan Ćirković have critiqued this defense.

Reviews
A review from Virginia Commonwealth University said the book "deserves a place on the shelf" of those interested in these subjects.

See also
 Anthropic principle
 Bayesian inference
 Self-Indication Assumption Doomsday argument rebuttal

Notes

References

External links
Anthropic Bias: Observation Selection Effects in Science and Philosophy (full text)

2002 non-fiction books
Anthropic principle
Books about science
Routledge books
Works by Nick Bostrom